Burkina Faso Olympic football team represents Burkina Faso in international football competitions in Olympic Games. The selection is limited to players under the age of 23, except during the Olympic Games where the use of three overage players is allowed. The team is controlled by the Burkinabé Football Federation.

Other achievements

All Africa Games
Silver Medal: 2015

Current squad
20-man Squad called for the 2015 All-Africa Games.

References

under23
African national under-23 association football teams